Cretapenaeus berberus is an extinct species of prawn which existed in Morocco during the Late Cretaceous period. It is the only species in the genus Cretapenaeus.

References

Penaeidae
Late Cretaceous crustaceans
Fossils of Morocco
Prehistoric crustacean genera
Decapod genera
Crustaceans described in 2006
Late Cretaceous animals of Africa
Fossil taxa described in 2006
Cretaceous Morocco